Rawson Law Stovall (born 1972) is the first nationally syndicated video game journalist in the United States. Stovall's first column appeared in the Abilene Reporter-News, his local newspaper, in 1982, when he was eleven. He began being distributed by the Universal Press Syndicate in April 1983 and by 1984 his column, 'The Vid Kid', appeared in over two dozen newspapers. After being reported on by The New York Times, he was featured on The Tonight Show Starring Johnny Carson, was on Discovery Channel's The New Tech Times and helped introduce the Nintendo Entertainment System at its North American launch.  

He retired from video game journalism in 1990 to attend college at the Southern Methodist University, and later went on to work various roles at companies such as Sony, Activision, Electronic Arts, MGM Interactive, and currently Concrete Software. At EA, he produced video games in The Sims franchise.

Biography

Early life and education 
Rawson Law Stovall was born in 1972 to Ronald L. Stovall, a Boy Scouts executive and regional manager for the Texas State Health Department, and Kay Law Stovall. He has a younger sister, Jennifer. Stovall lived in Abilene, Texas, where he attended Alta Vista Elementary School and Cooper High School. As a child, he had severe asthma and once spent three months at the National Jewish Hospital—he first visited an arcade on one of the hospital field trips.

Although Stovall first became interested in arcade video games in 1978, his father saw them as a waste of time and refused to buy him an Atari 2600. After he failed to get an Atari for Christmas in 1980, Stovall prepared and packaged nuts from the pecans in his backyard and sold them door-to-door the next year, earning enough to buy one. In fourth grade, he and two friends hosted mock TV skits about video games for class.

1982: Beginnings as a columnist 
Stovall realized that his local newspaper, the Abilene Reporter-News, was filled with movie reviews that were cheaper to see than buying a video game. However, there were no game reviews. Back then, games did not have screenshots on their packaging, and Stovall said that buying one was akin to a "gamble." 

At the end of the school year, increased pollen triggered his asthma and he was stuck inside and could not afford more games. His mother suggested he write an article for the local weekly Wiley Journal, but Stovall thought that an article could not hold all information and the weekly too small. His mother then suggested he write a column for the Reporter-News. He initially wanted to raise enough money to buy an advanced home computer to design games on. He contacted editor Dick Tarpley, presenting him with several sample columns and three letters of recommendation from his teachers and a local video game repairman. In 1982 Stovall's first column appeared in the Reporter-News at age ten, titled 'Video Beat'. He was paid $5 a column. 

Stovall was often rejected by newspapers because of his age: the guard at the San Francisco Chronicle would not let him in. After being brushed off several times with other papers on the phone, he resolved to enter the offices of the Odessa American with a three-piece business suit, a briefcase, and a business card. Stovall convinced the editor to publish the column, securing his first sale outside of Abilene.

1983–1990: Universal Press Syndicate and 'The Vid Kid' 
By January 1983, Stovall's column appeared in five newspapers, including the El Paso Times and Young Person Magazine. His mother was his secretary and proofread his work. He was the youngest person to receive the Texas Governor's Award for Outstanding Volunteer Service. Stovall was invited to Imagic's headquarters in Silicon Valley and would go on a promotional nationwide tour with their vice president Dennis Koble. 

When the San Jose Mercury News picked up the column, they dubbed it 'The Vid Kid.' His column ran in ten papers before Universal Press Syndicate began distributing him in April 1983 at the suggestion of the Mercury News' editor, which, aged eleven, made him the first nationally syndicated video game journalist. His mother credited his success to his affinity with adults. Stovall also faced difficulties balancing school, journalism and health issues. 

In 1983, Stovall attended the Consumer Electronics Show in Chicago with special permission as a minor. He was able to interview Nolan Bushnell and David Crane, and soon after was reported on in The New York Times. This led him to be invited by producers to appear on television shows such as CBS Morning News, Good Morning America, NBC Nightly News and That's Incredible!. He attended CES the following years, where he was consulted by many industry professionals and companies, such as Activison president James Levy. He was featured on the front page of The Wall Street Journal.

His family visited Los Angeles for two weeks for his appearance on The Tonight Show Starring Johnny Carson. In 1984 he spoke at Bits & Bytes, the first computer show for children, and wrote The Vid Kid's Book of Home Video Games, a collection of eighty of his game reviews published by Doubleday. Library Journal said that although Stovall's age and writing style made the book unusual, it was average overall. He appeared on a regular segment of The New Tech Times airing on the Discovery Channel, which paid him $850 each season, reviewing teenage-oriented software and games. Executive producer Jeff Clark said that Stovall had the "business ability and vocabulary of a 40-year-old, but the mind-set of a thirteen-year-old." By 1984 his columns appeared in over two dozen newspapers, and he charged $10 per column. In 1985 Stovall helped to introduce the Nintendo Entertainment System at its North American launch. His workshop contained over six hundred video games and five computers.

Later career 
Stovall retired from journalism in 1990 to attend college at the Southern Methodist University in Dallas. He graduated with a degree in cinema due to the lack of game-related degrees. After college, he moved to Los Angeles and worked at Sony, Activision, Electronic Arts, and MGM Interactive in various roles. He was a game developer at Activision in the 1990s and an industry producer. At EA, he produced The Godfather (2006) and video games from franchises Medal of Honor and The Sims. He currently works on mobile games as a senior designer for Concrete Software after being hired in 2014.

Personal life
Stovall lives in the area of Minneapolis–Saint Paul. He previously lived in Redwood City, California. Stovall is married to Jenn, who teaches art history at the University of Minnesota.

Bibliography

See also
List of syndicated columnists

Footnotes

References

External links
 
 Rawson Stovall at MobyGames
 @rawsonstovall on Twitter
 2018 interview at the Internet Archive
 The Vid Kid's Book of Home Video Games (1984) at the Internet Archive

1972 births
Living people
American critics
American video game designers
People from Texas
Video game critics
Video game producers
Electronic Arts employees
Southern Methodist University alumni